Nathan Peck (January 13, 1925 – October 24, 2015) was an American jazz trombonist.

Early life
Peck was born in New York City on January 13, 1925. His father was a cinema projectionist. Peck began playing the trombone as a teenager.

Later life and career
After leaving high school Peck was drafted into the army and became part of Glenn Miller's band. He remained with the band until after World War II ended. He played with Don Redman in 1947. He studied classical music at the Paris Conservatory from 1949 to 1951, while playing and recording with leading jazz musicians such as Coleman Hawkins (1949), James Moody (1949–50), and Roy Eldridge (1950). In the 1950s Peck played on television in New York, and in 1953 he recorded with Dizzy Gillespie. Peck shuttled between Paris and New York until 1957, when he married dancer Vera Tietz and settled in France.

In France, Peck played with Michel Legrand, André Hodeir and Duke Ellington. Peck spent some time in England and Germany, working as a staff musician at Sender Freies Berlin and playing with Quincy Jones and the Clarke-Boland Big Band (1963–69). He relocated to London in 1965, where he became active in the studios, film, and television. He played with Benny Goodman in 1970–72 and with Peter Herbolzheimer in 1979.

Latterly, Peck worked mainly as a contractor with his company, London Studio Orchestras. While this led to him ending his playing career, he shifted his talents to putting together the best blend of session musicians that he could find. 'The Italian Job', 'Yentl', 'The 3 Muskateers', and many more great films, especially with French composers Michel Legrand and Philippe Sarde.  He died on October 24, 2015.

Discography
With the Kenny Clarke/Francy Boland Big Band
Jazz Is Universal (Atlantic, 1962)
Handle with Care (Atlantic, 1963)
Now Hear Our Meanin' (Columbia, 1963 [1965])
Swing, Waltz, Swing (Philips, 1966)
Sax No End (SABA, 1967)
Out of the Folk Bag (Columbia, 1967)
17 Men and Their Music (Campi, 1967)
All Smiles (MPS, 1968)
Faces (MPS, 1968)
Latin Kaleidoscope (MPS, 1968)
Fellini 712 (MPS, 1969)
All Blues (MPS, 1969)
More Smiles (MPS, 1969)
Clarke Boland Big Band en Concert avec Europe 1 (Tréma, 1969 [1992])
Off Limits (Polydor, 1970)
November Girl (Black Lion, 1970 [1975]) with Carmen McRae
With Dizzy Gillespie
Dizzy Digs Paris (Giant Steps, 1953 [2006])

References

External links
 Peck featured on BBC radio's Last Word

American jazz trombonists
Male trombonists
Musicians from New York (state)
1925 births
2015 deaths
American male jazz musicians
Kenny Clarke/Francy Boland Big Band members
Glenn Miller Orchestra members
United States Army personnel of World War II